INAS World Athletics Championships are a biennial international athletics competition hosted by the International Sports Federation for Persons with Intellectual Disability for athletes who have an intellectual impairment and compete in the T20 and F20 classes.

Athletic events contested

Outdoor events
Key
 M - men's events only contested
 F - women's events only contested
 X - both events contested
 — - not contested in that year

Indoor events

INAS World Athletics Outdoor Championships

INAS World Athletics Indoor Championships

Medal tables

Outdoor
As of 2017. Scotland, England and Wales competed from 1989 to 2003, Great Britain competed from 2005 onwards.

Indoor
As of 2020.

See also
INAS World Athletics Cross Country Championships
INAS World Athletics Half Marathon Championships
INAS Open European Athletics Championships

References

Recurring sporting events established in 1989
Parasports world championships
Athletics world championships
Para-athletics competitions